John Emmet Sheridan (June 14, 1877 – July 3, 1948) was an illustrator well known in his lifetime for his cover art for The Saturday Evening Post, his illustrations for Collier's Weekly and Ladies' Home Journal, and his commercial advertisements.  He is "credited with the idea of using posters to advertise college sports." Sheridan was a member of the Dutch Treat Club, and a frequent contributor to the program of their annual banquet and show, and was an instructor at New York's School of Visual Arts at the time of its founding.

Biography 
He was born on June 14, 1877 in Tomah, Wisconsin.

Sheridan attended Georgetown University graduating in 1901.

During World War I, he created many patriotic posters in support of the United States' war effort as part of the committee of artists that also included Charles Dana Gibson (creator of the Gibson Girl) and James Montgomery Flagg (creator of the iconic Uncle Sam recruiting poster).

Sheridan was art editor for the Washington Times (predecessor of the now-defunct Washington Times-Herald) and worked for the San Francisco Chronicle in the development of its first color Sunday supplement. Between 1931 and 1939 he produced 13 cover illustrations for The Saturday Evening Post.

He died on July 3, 1948 at Roosevelt Hospital in Manhattan, New York City.

Signatures and monograms 
As an artist of advertisements and magazine covers, Sheridan was not always free to sign his full name to his art work. As a result, many of his illustrations contain only stylized monograms to identify the artist.

Work

References

Bibliography

1877 births
1948 deaths
American cartoonists
19th-century American painters
19th-century American male artists
American male painters
20th-century American painters
Georgetown University alumni
American poster artists
People from Tomah, Wisconsin
Painters from New York City
Artists from Wisconsin
20th-century American male artists